The Beginning of a Beautiful Life is the fourth studio album from Indonesian pop group Maliq & D'Essentials. Released on 8 July 2010, it is the last album to feature keyboardist Ifa Fachir who left the band the following year.

Track listing

Personnel 
Maliq & D'Essentials
Angga Puradiredja – vocals
Indah Wisnuwardhana – vocals
Widi Puradiredja – drums, Moog
Dendy "Javafinger" Sukarno – bass
Arya "Lale" Aditya – guitar
Ifa Fachir – keyboards

Additional musicians
Amar Ibrahim – trumpet and flugelhorn (tracks 1, 2, 4 and 7)
Reza Jozef "Rejoz" Patty – percussion (tracks 2, 3, 4 and 7)
Doni Koeswinarno – flute and saxophone (tracks 1, 2 and 7)

Production
Eki "EQ" Puradiredja – producer
Widi Puradiredja – co-producer, engineer
Indra Lesmana – mixing and mastering
Dendy "Javafinger" Sukarno – engineer

References

2010 albums
Maliq & D'Essentials albums